The 1972 United States presidential election in Tennessee took place on November 7, 1972, as part of the 1972 United States presidential election. Tennessee voters chose 10 representatives, or electors, to the Electoral College, who voted for president and vice president.

Tennessee was won by incumbent President Richard Nixon (R–California), with 67.70% of the popular vote, against George McGovern (D–South Dakota), with 29.75% of the popular vote. John G. Schmitz was the only other candidate on the ballot, and, as the candidate for the American Party, he received over 30,000 votes.

Stewart, Houston, Perry, Lewis, and Jackson counties were the only five of Tennessee's ninety-five counties to vote for McGovern. , this is the best showing of any Republican candidate in the state. This is also the last election in which Haywood County voted for a Republican presidential candidate.

Results

Results by county

References

Tennessee
1972
1972 Tennessee elections